Priory was a three-piece American rock band based out of Portland, Oregon. The band formed in 2008 and released their first record on Expunged Records in 2011. The band's single, "Weekend", reached #30 on Billboard's Hot Rock & Alternative Songs chart and #37 on Billboard's Mainstream Top 40 chart in 2015. The band's sound is a blend of electronic instrumentation and heavy guitar.

Need To Know (2014-2015) 
Priory signed to Warner Bros. Records in the spring of 2014. On June 30, 2014, Priory released their single "Weekend" on iTunes.  On September 3, 2014, Priory premiered the video, directed by David Vincent Wolf, on Idolator; it stars actors Bailey Noble and Nick Krause.  The band completed work on their second full-length album Need To Know, which was released in 2014 by Warner Bros. Records. They then left on a nationwide tour supporting The Kooks later in 2014, along with supporting artist Halsey. During the tour they promoted their first single "Weekend", peaking at #15 on Billboard Alternative Charts and #26 on Billboard Pop Charts. Priory later flew to New York and performed on MTV Big Morning Buzz, and several months later performed on Jimmy Kimmel Live! in Los Angeles. In 2015 the band left on tour as support for Kaiser Chiefs.

Alone With Me (2016-present)

Discography

Studio albums

Extended plays

Singles

Members 
 Brandon Johnson: lead vocals, bass (2008-2014) lead vocals,  guitar (2014-2016)
 Kyle Dieker: guitar, vocals, samples (since 2008)

Past members
 Greg Harpel: guitar (2008-2014)
 Richie Stitch: drums (2008-2011)
 Joe Mengis: drums (2011-2015)
 Miles Johnson: drums (since 2016), bass (live, 2014–2016)
 Rian Lewis: dynthesizers and percussion (2014-2015)

References

Musical groups established in 2009
Musical groups from Portland, Oregon
2009 establishments in Oregon